The 2014 Russia Open Grand Prix was the thirteenth grand prix gold and grand prix tournament of the 2014 BWF Grand Prix Gold and Grand Prix. The tournament was held in Sports Hall Olympic, Vladivostok, Russia July 22 until July 27, 2014 and had a total purse of US$50,000.

Men's singles

Seeds

 Vladimir Ivanov
 Vladimir Malkov
 Ville Lang
 Kazumasa Sakai

Finals

Top half

Bottom half

Women's singles

Seeds
 Natalia Perminova
 Stefani Stoeva
 Olga Golovanova
 Yui Hashimoto

Finals

Top half

Bottom half

Men's doubles

Seeds
  Vladimir Ivanov / Ivan Sozonov
  Nikita Khakimov / Vasily Kuznetsov

Draw

Women's doubles

Seeds
  Gabriela Stoeva / Stefani Stoeva
  Misato Aratama / Megumi Taruno

Draw

Mixed doubles

Seeds
  Anatoliy Yartsev / Evgeniya Kosetskaya
  Evgenij Dremin / Evgenia Dimova
  Rodion Kargaev / Ekaterina Bolotova
  Vasily Kuznetsov / Victoria Slobodjanuk

Finals

Top half

Bottom half

References 

BWF Grand Prix Gold and Grand Prix
Russia Open Grand Prix
Sport in Vladivostok
Russia Open Grand Prix
Russian Open (badminton)